Paragliding Simulation is a 1991 video game developed by Atreid Concept and published by Loriciels for the AmigaThe player attempts to paraglides across a map avoiding obstacles and landing safely.

References

1991 video games
Amiga games
Amstrad CPC games
Atari ST games
DOS games
Multiplayer and single-player video games
Multiplayer hotseat games
Simulation video games
Video games developed in France
Virtual Studio games